Henry Chadwick Scholfield (September 19, 1866 - September 4, 1935) was a Canadian politician, who represented the electoral districts of Wellington South from 1911 to 1914, and St. George from 1926 to 1934, in the Legislative Assembly of Ontario. He was a member of the Ontario Conservative Party.

Born in Lloydtown, Ontario, he worked for The Dominion Bank in his youth, eventually becoming manager of a branch in Guelph. While residing there, he was elected as MPP for Wellington South in the 1911 election. He subsequently became cofounder and vice-president of Page-Hersey and Company, moving to Toronto as the company expanded its operations. He was elected to the legislature as MPP for St. George's in the 1926 election, and was reelected in the 1929 election. In his final term in the legislature he served as a minister without portfolio in the government of George Henry.

After retiring from politics in 1934, Scholfield suffered a heart attack in late August 1935, and died ten days later at his home in Toronto.

References

External links 
 

1866 births
1935 deaths
Progressive Conservative Party of Ontario MPPs
People from Guelph
People from King, Ontario